József Kosztyán (born February 11, 1955) is a Hungarian sprint canoer who competed in the early 1980s. At the 1980 Summer Olympics in Moscow, he finished fifth in the K-4 1000 m event.

References
Sports-Reference.com profile

External links

1955 births
Canoeists at the 1980 Summer Olympics
Hungarian male canoeists
Living people
Olympic canoeists of Hungary
Place of birth missing (living people)